Jennifer Abod (born 1946) is an American feminist activist, musician, journalist, and filmmaker.

Education 
Jennifer Abod is the sister of feminist activist Susan Abod. She obtained her Bachelor of Science from Southern Illinois University, her Master of Science from Southern Connecticut State University, and her Ph.D. Intercultural Media Education from Union Institute and University.

Feminist Work 
Abod was a co-founder and the singer of the New Haven Women's Liberation Rock Band Papa Don't Lay that Shit on Me from 1970 until 1976. The highly political band played, once, in front of the White House during a women's liberation march, and at Niantic State Prison, where Erica Huggins was imprisoned. The group also recorded with the Chicago Women's Liberation Rock Band. Her voice was described as "a deep blue voice she could have taken to Hollywood," by Naomi Weisstein.

In 1972, Ms. published "Feminist Rock: No More Balls and Chains," which Abod contributed to, along with Virginia Blaisdell and Naomi Weisstein. She also co-wrote "The Liberation of Lydia," the first feminist radio soap opera in 1970. She was a radio broadcaster for 19 years and was the first woman in Connecticut to host a nightly AM talk radio program, "The Jennifer Abod Show," which ran from 1977 until 1980. In 1985, Abod became an associate of the Women's Institute for Freedom of the Press (WIFP). WIFP is an American nonprofit publishing organization. The organization works to increase communication between women and connect the public with forms of women-based media.

Abod would go on to co-found Women's Health Advocates, and along with Esta Soler and Laura Ponsor Sporazzi, she interviewed women in drug treatment programs in the Northeast. This program evaluated the treatment of women in these facilities, and were published in a report, "The ABC's of Drug Treatment for Women," in 1976. In 1988 she formed her own production company, Profile Productions, which produced and distributed media relating to feminist activists and cultural workers. Her first documentary was released in 2002, titled "The Edge of Each Other's Battles: The Vision of Audre Lorde."

Abod's personal archive is in the collection of the Sophia Smith Collection at Smith College.

Filmography

See also
 List of female film and television directors
 List of LGBT-related films directed by women

References

External links

1946 births
Living people
20th-century American women musicians
20th-century American musicians
20th-century American women writers
American feminists
American talk radio hosts
American women film directors
American women film producers
American women screenwriters
Feminist musicians
American radio hosts
American women radio presenters
Union Institute & University alumni
Southern Illinois University alumni
Southern Connecticut State University alumni
21st-century American women